António Pereira (born 10 July 1975) is a Portuguese race walker.

Achievements

References

1975 births
Living people
Portuguese male racewalkers
Athletes (track and field) at the 2008 Summer Olympics
Olympic athletes of Portugal